Vacqueyras is a commune in the Vaucluse department in the Provence-Alpes-Côte d'Azur region in southeastern France.

Vacqueyras is also the name of an Appellation for a wine from the Côtes du Rhône.

Geography

Access 
Departmental Route 8 arrives at the north of the commune, then Departmental Route 7 traverses the commune on a north-south axis, forking to the southeast near Beaumes-de-Venise. Departmental route 52 then continues on to the south.

Departmental Route 233 leaves at the east near Peyre's Wood.

Neighbouring communes

Terrain 
Containing many alternating little valleys of minimal depth and plains + hills to the east, (261 m to the Muse), the extremity is at the Dentelles de Montmirail.

Geology 
The Dentelles de Montmirail are the furthest west of the Massif des Baronnies and constitute the first advance of the Alps into the Rhone Valley.

Rocky stones from the Late Jurassic (Tithonian) period with clay-limestone soil dominate the area.

Hydrography 
The small stream Limade passes to the north of and flows into the Ouvèze, which passes to the west.

The Canal de Carpentras  built in 1856, crosses the commune, and provides irrigation, thanks to a network of fillioles(small irrigation channels).

Plants 
Mediterranean plants on the Dentelles de Montmirail compare to those from the Alpilles in many places. One can find aromatic plants (thyme, rosemary, fennel, lavender), Evergreen Oaks and Provençal White Pines (Aleppo Pines), etc.

Vines grow well on the hillsides and also on the stony flat ground, at higher levels.

Population

See also
 Dentelles de Montmirail
Communes of the Vaucluse department
Vacqueyras AOC
Raimbaut de Vaqueiras

References

Communes of Vaucluse